Don't Stop the Party may refer to:

 "Don't Stop the Party" (Black Eyed Peas song), 2011
 "Don't Stop the Party" (Pitbull song), 2012